Piveshk (also Romanized as Pīveshk; also known as Beyāsak, Bey Beshk, Bīāsak, Bīāsk, Pey Beshk, Pī Bashk, and Pvishk) is a village in Piveshk Rural District, Lirdaf District, Jask County, Hormozgan Province, Iran. At the 2006 census, its population was 1,056, in 250 families.

References 

Populated places in Jask County